Australobarbarus is a genus of dicynodont from Late Permian (Wuchiapingian) of Russia.

References 

Dicynodonts
Permian tetrapods
Extinct animals of Russia
Fossil taxa described in 2000
Anomodont genera